Al-Sayyal is a Syrian town located in Abu Kamal District, Deir ez-Zor. According to the Syria Central Bureau of Statistics (CBS), Al-Sayyal had a population of 14,392 in the 2004 census. Al Sayyal was captured by Syrian Arab Army on 6 December 2017 from ISIS.

References 

Populated places in Deir ez-Zor Governorate
Populated places on the Euphrates River